Marlon Parker is the founder of Reconstructed Living Labs (RLabs) - a South African social entrepreneur who uses information communications technology (ICT) to empower communities, a World Economic Forum Young Global Leader and named by the Mail and Guardian as 1 of 300 young South Africans you have to take out to lunch. He was elected an Ashoka Fellow in 2014.

Parker is a former Lecturer at Cape Peninsula University of Technology and currently head of Mxit Reach, which is centered on using the innovative technology built by Mxit to create free mobile educational, health care, agricultural and community applications. With over 50 million users,  Mxit is Africa's largest social network.

Parker's work as a social entrepreneur, and in particular his successes with RLabs franchise, has seen Reconstructed Living Labs popping up all over the world in places like  Brazil, Namibia, Tanzania, Nigeria and Somalia. The RLabs model has been replicated in 23 countries, it has incubated 22 social enterprises, and employs 80 people – most of them in Cape Town. More than four million people have accessed support services through RLabs.

He was named the National LEAD SA Hero of 2015, a Primedia Broadcasting initiative, supported by Independent Newspapers to promote active citizenship. Founded in August 2010, shortly after the historic 2010 Soccer World Cup, Lead SA was born to celebrate the achievements of the country while taking responsibility for its problems and challenges.

References

External links
 Lecturer uses Mxit to counsel addicts IOL August 31, 2008.
 300 Young South Africans: Science and Education Mail and Guardian 11 JUN 2009
 From Cape Flats to global heights: Marlon Parker, a force for social change 10 MAY 2012
 A model for social change Business Report December 30, 2013
 Marlon Parker launches RLabs Namibia Namibia Economist 19 April 2013
 100 World Class South Africans: Marlon Parker City Press 22 May 2013

Academic staff of Cape Peninsula University of Technology
Ashoka Fellows